Waxhaw is a town in Union County, North Carolina, United States. The population was 20,534 according to the 2020 Census. The population grew 108.28% from 2010. The name is derived from the indigenous people who lived in the area, who were known as the Waxhaw people.

Geography
Waxhaw is located at  (34.928201, -80.744835). 

Waxhaw's northernmost municipal boundary is located four and one-half miles south of the Charlotte southernmost city limit. Waxhaw is part of Union County.
 
Waxhaw is located in the historic region called The Waxhaws and both the region and the town are named after the indigenous Native American tribe who lived there prior to colonial settlement. Europeans sometimes referred to their settlements in the area as, The Waxhaw Settlement. 

The town of Waxhaw is in the Piedmont region of North Carolina, which is a wooded area with rolling hills. This region is where gold was first discovered in the United States. The Howie Gold Mine is not far from the city limits. By 1935, 50,000 ounces of gold had been mined from this location. The Howie Gold mine operated until World War II, when most mines were shut down due to workforce changes during the war effort.

History
The original inhabitants of the region were a Native American people group known alternately as either the Wysacky or the Waxhaws. The first European to record contacting the group was the Spanish conquistador Juan Pardo. In 1711, the Waxhaw aided the British colonists of North Carolina in their war against the Tuscarora, a decision that antagonized the Tuscaroras Iroquoian allies in New York, who subsequently began raiding the Waxhaw tribe. These raids continued until 1715, when the Waxhaw joined the Yamasee war effort against the British colony of South Carolina. The tribes involvement in the Yamasee War led to their destruction at the hands of South Carolina's Catawba allies and the freeing of their land for European settlement. 

The area was first settled by colonists in the mid-eighteenth century. Most settlers were of German and Scots-Irish origin. Settlers became subsistence farmers and were known for being independent. Andrew Jackson, who later would become the seventh President of the United States, was born nearby in 1767, prior to the American Revolution. There is some disagreement as to which of the Carolinas was his birthplace because of the proximity of the border between the two. However, there are historical marker signs around Waxhaw, North Carolina describing Andrew Jackson's early connection to the area. His relationship to the area also is documented at the Museum of the Waxhaws. Andrew Jackson State Park is minutes from downtown Waxhaw, which has a memorial and other information about Andrew Jackson

The arrival of the railroad in 1888 created access to the markets of Atlanta and helped the town reach prosperity. The railroad tracks were laid through the center of town to show the importance of the railroad system to the community. The railroad remains in the center of town and now, is bordered by a broad landscaped area that divides the rows of stores on either side.

Beginning in the late nineteenth century, the community began to develop cotton mill factories for manufacturing textiles. The railroad helped increase access for the products of this industry. Cotton manufacturing was important to the region through the 1940s. Postwar changes in the economy, with shifts of the textile industry to jobs in other areas of the country and out of the country, required the community to adapt to new conditions.

Waxhaw Today 
Waxhaw has evolved into an antique and fine dining center. Its Small Town Main Street committee is working on an integrated approach to developing and marketing the historic center of town. Waxhaw currently has dozens of specialty shops and dining restaurants. Restaurants located in town range from Mom-and-Pop restaurants to fine dining bistros. 

The Waxhaw Historic District is listed on the National Register of Historic Places. It includes retail businesses as well as architecturally significant houses near the center of town. Also listed is the Pleasant Grove Camp Meeting Ground.

Residents and town officials are working on additional improvement plans. In the downtown area, there is a town park and a skate park for youths. Near the skate park is a playground and a walking area connected to downtown. New housing has been built along NC 75 to the east and west of town, as well as NC 16 (Providence Road) to the north.

Near Waxhaw is Cane Creek Park, a  park, featuring scenic areas and recreation activities. The facility, on Harkey Road south of Waxhaw, was a cooperative venture between Union County, the Union Conservation District, and the Soil Conservation Service of the U.S. Department of Agriculture.

Currently, Waxhaw is undergoing significant suburban development and has grown by 6.4% in 2019 alone. New developments include individual residential housing, apartments, townhouses, and commercial complexes.

Waxhaw's downtown area is built to surround the train tracks that brought prosperity to the town. The tracks are abutted with green areas and parking. Guests can walk over a historic bridge to go over the train tracks, and there is a viewing area. Also a few minutes walk away, are a skateboard park and a playground. Although the train doesn't follow a public schedule, viewers try to guess the times when the train will come for viewing. Sometimes a train employee will stand on the bridge.

Government 
Waxhaw has a town government that was incorporated in 1889. The government is council-manager in form and it is governed by a board of commissioners that consists of six members. All members are elected to four-year terms in non-partisan elections that take place in odd-numbered years. Three commission seats are up in one cycle, then two years later the other two commission seats come up for election at the same time as that of the mayor. The town is not divided into election districts and the top vote recipients win the seats of each election. Ronald P. Pappas is the current mayor of Waxhaw.

Demographics

2020 census

As of the 2020 United States census, there were 20,534 people, 4,773 households, and 4,051 families residing in the town. In the same census, the median household income was $116,964, which is more than double the North Carolina median income of $56,642

2010 census
As of the census of 2010, there were 9,859 people, 3,242 households, and 2,626 families residing in the town. For the population density, there were 854.0 people per square mile (329.95/km2) and 3,517 housing units. As for the racial makeup of the town, there were 78.1% White, 11.00% African American, 2.1% from two or more races, 2.0% Asian, and 0.04% Native American. The Hispanic or Latino of any race was 6.4% of the population.

There were 3,242 households, out of which 41.8% had children under the age of eighteen living with them, 81.0% were married couples living together, 10.5% had a female householder with no spouse present, and 19.0% were non-families. The average household size was 3.04 and the average family size was 3.41.

In the town, the population age range was from 34.6% under the age of 18, 3.1% from 20 to 24, 32.3% from 25 to 44, 21.2% from 45 to 64, and 7% who were 65 years of age or older. The median age was 34.5 years. For every 100 females there were 93.6 males. For every 100 females age 18 and over, there were 88.8 males.

The median income for a household in the town was $73,188. The per capita income for the town was $27,949. The percentage of people below the poverty line was 8.9%.

Local schools

Public elementary schools
 Kensington Elementary School
 Sandy Ridge Elementary School
 Waxhaw Elementary School
 Western Union Elementary School
 New Town Elementary School
 Rea View Elementary School
 Marvin Elementary School
 Prospect Elementary School

Public middle schools
 Marvin Ridge Middle School
 Parkwood Middle school
 Cuthbertson Middle School

Public high schools
 Marvin Ridge High School
 South Providence High School
 Parkwood High School
 Cuthbertson High School
 Central Academy of Technology and Arts (CATA)

Private schools
 Arborbrook Christian Academy
 Omni Montessori School
 Metrolina Christian Academy
 North Point Christian Academy

Charter schools 
 Union Day Charter School
 Union Academy
 Apprentice Academy of North Carolina

Library 
The Waxhaw branch of the Union County Public Library system was founded in 1937 with the support of the Waxhaw Womens Club and the federal Works Progress Administration (WPA). It is located at 509 South Providence Street.

Notable people

References

External links
 Town website
 Visitor guide

Towns in Union County, North Carolina
Towns in North Carolina